Rowan County is a county located in the northeastern part of the U.S. state of Kentucky, in the Eastern Kentucky Coalfield region. As of the 2020 census, the population was 24,662. Its county seat is Morehead. The county was created in 1856 from parts of Fleming and Morgan counties, and named after John Rowan, who represented Kentucky in the House of Representatives and the Senate. With regard to the sale of alcohol, it is classified as a moist county in which alcohol sales are prohibited, but unlike a dry county, it contains a "wet" city, Morehead, where packaged alcohol sales are allowed.

History

It is believed that Rowan County was first explored by those of European descent in 1773 by a party of surveyors from Pennsylvania. The first settlement was established in Farmers, a town 10 miles west of Morehead. Its population rapidly increased due its fertile farming land and proximity to water sources. Additional settlers came to Rowan County from Virginia in the late 18th century after being awarded land grants at the end of the American Revolutionary War. Clearfield was the second settlement established in the county, being colonized by a Virginia aristocrat named Dixon Clack in the early 1800s. It accommodated the first sawmill in the county.

In 1854, Morehead became the third community to be settled in the area. Colonel John Hargis founded the city after purchasing land in the county, naming it after governor James Morehead. Rowan County came into existence in May 1856, seceding from Morgan County and Fleming County. It was divided into four districts with Morehead being declared the county seat. In 1896, a tax was levied on Morehead, sourcing it with the revenue needed to construct hard surface roads. The road system was extended to Farmers by 1920. in 1971 Rowan county senior high school was built

In summer 2015, Rowan County attracted national attention when County Clerk Kim Davis refused, on grounds of religion, to follow a court order requiring her to issue marriage licenses to same-sex couples.

Geography

Adjacent counties
 Lewis County  (north)
 Carter County  (northeast)
 Elliott County  (east)
 Morgan County  (south)
 Menifee County  (southwest)
 Bath County  (west)
 Fleming County  (northwest)

National protected area
 Daniel Boone National Forest (part)

Demographics

As of the census of 2010, there were 23,333 people and 7,956 households residing in the county. The racial make-up was 96.1% White, 1.5% Black or African American, 0.1% Native American, 0.8% Asian, 0% Pacific Islander, and 1.0% from two or more races.  1.3% of the population were Hispanic or Latino of any race.

There were 7,956 households, of which 19.6% had children under the age of 18 living with them, 52.40% were married couples living together, 10.20% had a female householder with no husband present, and 34.20% were non-families. 27.00% of all households were made up of individuals, and 9.20% had someone living alone who was 65 years of age or older. The average household size was 2.39 and the average family size was 2.91.

The age distribution was 20.30% under the age of 18, 23.50% from 18 to 24, 25.90% from 25 to 44, 20.00% from 45 to 64, and 10.40% who were 65 years of age or older. The median age was 30 years. Both the unusually large portion of the population in the 18-to-24 range and the relatively low median age are mainly because of the presence of Morehead State University. For every 100 females there were 94.60 males. For every 100 females age 18 and over, there were 93.10 males.

The median household income was $33,081. Males had a median income of $26,777 and females $20,104. The per capita income was $13,888. About 15.90% of families and 21.30% of the population were below the poverty line, including 20.80% of those under age 18 and 16.20% of those age 65 or over.

In 2014, the county had 14,263 registered voters. Of these, 9,394 were Democrats, 3,929 were Republicans, and 626 listed themselves as members of other parties.

Politics
Rowan County is known as a swing county. It voted Republican in 2000, 2012, 2016, and 2020 and Democratic in 2004 and 2008, but in most of those elections the winning candidate won by small margins. This changed in 2016 when Republican Donald Trump won the county with nearly 59% of the vote to Democrat Hillary Clinton's 37%, the largest margin of victory since Jimmy Carter won the county in 1976. Rowan County was one of four counties in Eastern Kentucky to vote for Barack Obama in 2008. It is the only county in the eastern coalfields where the Republican nominee Donald Trump never won over 60% of the vote.

Legal compliance
In June and July 2015, the Rowan county clerk, Kim Davis, refused several residents their right to marry, a right guaranteed by the ruling of the Supreme Court on June 26, 2015, that same-sex marriages are legal across the entirety of the United States. Privately held religious belief was given as the reason for non-compliance with the Court's ruling and with the state governor's executive order of June 26 instructing all state agencies and clerks to comply with it.

Media
 The Morehead News – local paper
 WMKY – Morehead State University radio
 W10BM – TV
 Rowan Review – local online news
 The Trail Blazer – Morehead State University newspaper
 News Center -  Morehead State University Television

Communities

Cities
 Lakeview Heights
 Morehead (county seat)

Census-designated place
 Farmers

Other unincorporated communities

 Clearfield
 Cranston
 Elliottville
 Gates
 Haldeman
 Hayes Crossing
 Hilda
 Paragon
 Pelfrey
 Rodburn
 Sharkey
 Smile
 Triplett
 Wagner Corner

Notable people
 Kim Davis – Rowan County Clerk who was jailed for refusing to comply with a federal court order directing her to issue marriage licenses to same-sex couples following the United States Supreme Court decision in Obergefell vs. Hodges.
 Cora Wilson Stewart (1875–1958) - First woman to be elected to the position of the president of the Kentucky Education Association. Opened Moonlight School, first in Rowan County, Kentucky, and then across the United States, to educate illiterate adults at night in the schools where children studied during the day.

See also
 National Register of Historic Places listings in Rowan County, Kentucky

References
Specific

General
 Wet Dry map

External links
 The Kentucky Highlands Project
 Rowan County Sheriff's Department

 
Kentucky counties
Counties of Appalachia
1856 establishments in Kentucky
Populated places established in 1856